Zdeněk Sedlák (born January 18, 1974) is a Czech former professional ice hockey right winger.

Sedlák played 380 games in the Czech Extraliga for HC Zlín, HC Železárny Třinec, HC Slezan Opava, HC Plzeň, HC Sparta Praha and HC Vsetín. He also played in the SM-liiga for Blues and JYP. 

Sedlák was also a member of the Czech Republic national team and played in the 2002 World Ice Hockey Championships.

References

External links

1974 births
Living people
AaB Ishockey players
HC Ambrì-Piotta players
Czech ice hockey right wingers
HC Dinamo Minsk players
Espoo Blues players
HC Havířov players
SHK Hodonín players
Hvidovre Ligahockey players
JYP Jyväskylä players
HC Oceláři Třinec players
Sportspeople from Přerov
HC Plzeň players
HC ZUBR Přerov players
HC Pustertal Wölfe players
SK Horácká Slavia Třebíč players
HC Slezan Opava players
HC Sparta Praha players
Hokej Šumperk 2003 players
HC Tábor players
HC TWK Innsbruck players
VHK Vsetín players
PSG Berani Zlín players
Expatriate ice hockey players in Austria
Czech expatriate sportspeople in Austria
Expatriate ice hockey players in Belarus
Czech expatriate sportspeople in Belarus
Expatriate ice hockey players in Denmark
Czech expatriate sportspeople in Denmark
Czech expatriate ice hockey players in Finland
Expatriate ice hockey players in Italy
Czech expatriate sportspeople in Italy